André Salardaine (8 June 1908 in Charron – 2 June 1985 in Puilboreau) was a French Gaullist politician and a member of the Union for the New Republic (UNR).

He was a mayor of La Rochelle during twelve years (8 March 1959 – 14 March 1971) and an MP of the Charente-Maritime's 1st constituency during six years (25 November 1962 – 30 May 1968).

Political mandates

Local mandate 
 Mayor of La Rochelle : 8 March 1959 – 14 March 1971

National mandate 
 MP of the Charente-Maritime's 1st constituency : 25 November 1962 – 30 May 1968

References 

1908 births
1985 deaths
Politicians of the French Fifth Republic
Gaullists
Union for the New Republic politicians
People from Charente-Maritime
Mayors of La Rochelle